2-deoxy-scyllo-Inosose synthase (EC 4.2.3.124, btrC (gene), neoC (gene), kanC (gene)) is an enzyme with systematic name D-glucose-6-phosphate phosphate-lyase (2-deoxy-scyllo-inosose-forming). This enzyme catalyses the following chemical reaction

 D-glucose 6-phosphate  2-deoxy-L-scyllo-inosose + phosphate

This enzyme requires Co2+.

References

External links 
 

EC 4.2.3